Essen (Oldenburg) is a municipality in the district of Cloppenburg, in Lower Saxony, Germany.

Essen consists of the following villages: Addrup, Ahausen, Barlage, Bartmannsholte, Beverdiek, Bevern, Bokel, Brokstreek, Calhorn, Darrel, Essen proper, Felde, Gut Lage, Herbergen, Hülsenmoor, Nordholte, Osteressen, Sandloh and Uptloh.

The reference to Oldenburg serves to allow disambiguation with the much larger Essen (Ruhr). It is part of the official name as stated in the town constitution, which also prescribes the styling using parentheses. 

The mayor of Essen is Heinrich Kreßmann, first elected in 2016, and re-elected in 2021.

References

Cloppenburg (district)